Volleyball at the 1991 Mediterranean Games was held in Athens, Greece from June 11 to July 12, 1991.

Medalists

Standings

Men's competition

Women's competition

External links
 Complete 1991 Mediterranean Games Standings

Sports at the 1991 Mediterranean Games
Volleyball at the Mediterranean Games
1991 in volleyball